Crisia is a genus of bryozoans in the family Crisiidae. Some species are known from the fossil record.

Species 

 Crisia acropora 
 Crisia aculeata 
 Crisia acuminata 
 †Crisia acuta 
 †Crisia admota 
 †Crisia angusta 
 Crisia arctica 
 †Crisia berardi 
 Crisia bifurcata 
 †Crisia borgii 
 †Crisia boutini 
 Crisia brasiliensis 
 Crisia bucinaform 
 Crisia calyptostoma 
 Crisia carolina 
 Crisia conferta 
 Crisia constans 
 Crisia corallina 
 †Crisia corbini 
 Crisia crassipes 
 Crisia cribraria 
 Crisia crisidioides 
 Crisia cuneata 
 Crisia cylindrica 
 Crisia delicatula 
 Crisia denticulata 
 †Crisia destefanii 
 Crisia eburnea 
 Crisia eburneodenticulata 
 Crisia elegans 
 †Crisia elliptica 
 Crisia elongata 
 Crisia ficulnea 
 Crisia fistulosa 
 Crisia fragosa 
 Crisia globosa 
 †Crisia gracilis 
 †Crisia grandis 
 Crisia grimaldi 
 Crisia guang 
 Crisia hamifera 
 †Crisia haueri 
 †Crisia hoernesii 
 Crisia holdsworthii 
 Crisia howensis 
 Crisia hurghadaensis 
 Crisia incurva 
 Crisia inflata 
 Crisia irregularis 
 Crisia kerguelensis 
 Crisia klugei 
 †Crisia kuehni 
 †Crisia lateralis 
 †Crisia lecointrei 
 †Crisia limata 
 †Crisia lowei 
 †Crisia macilenta 
 †Crisia macrostoma 
 Crisia margaritacea 
 Crisia martinicensis 
 Crisia maxima 
 †Crisia megalostoma 
 Crisia micra 
 †Crisia mirabilis 
 †Crisia morozovae 
 Crisia nordenskjoldi 
 †Crisia nozeroyensis 
 Crisia obliqua 
 Crisia occidentalis 
 Crisia operculata 
 Crisia oranensis 
 Crisia osburni 
 Crisia parvinternodata 
 Crisia patagonica 
 †Crisia plauensis 
 †Crisia procera 
 Crisia pseudosolena 
 Crisia pugeti 
 †Crisia pulchella 
 Crisia pyrula 
 Crisia ramosa 
 Crisia recurva 
 Crisia romanica 
 †Crisia rugosa 
 †Crisia scalaris 
 †Crisia schmitzi 
 †Crisia serrata 
 Crisia serrulata 
 Crisia sertularioides 
 Crisia setosa 
 Crisia sigmoidea 
 Crisia simplex 
 Crisia sinclarensis 
 Crisia spissus 
 †Crisia strangulata 
 †Crisia striatula 
 †Crisia subaequalis 
 †Crisia taiwanica 
 Crisia tenella 
 Crisia tenera 
 Crisia tenuis 
 Crisia transversata 
 Crisia tubulosa 
 Crisia vincentensis 
 Crisia zanzibarensis

See also 
 List of prehistoric bryozoan genera

References

External links 
 
 
 Crisia at fossilworks
 Crisia at WoRMS

Cyclostomatida
Stenolaemata genera